Vikrant Bhargava (विक्रान्त भार्गव; born 14 December 1972) is an Indian-born British businessman, and the co-founder and former marketing director of online casino operator PartyGaming.

Early life
Bhargava is an alumnus of the Indian Institute of Management Calcutta, and also holds a bachelor's degree in Technology in electrical engineering from IIT Delhi.

Career
Prior to joining PartyGaming, Bhargava was a credit officer at Bank of America, responsible for managing credit exposure and revenue for corporate clients, and a business analyst in the business development division of British Gas.

Bhargava joined PartyGaming (formerly iGlobalMedia) as marketing director in early 2000. In July 2001, he oversaw the marketing for the launch of PartyPoker, and was the face of Partygaming when it went public in 2005, at the time the London Stock Exchange's largest IPO of an internet company, valued at over $8 Billion.

In May 2006, Bhargava announced he would leave the company's board of directors at the end of the year. He also stepped down from his executive role in the company. Quoted in eGaming Review, John Shepherd, director of PartyGaming corporate communications, credited Bhargava with transforming PartyGaming into a multi-billion pound company. At the time of leaving PartyGaming, Bhargava's fortune was estimated to be £850 million. ($1.6 billion at that time)

Bhargava later became the head of a private investment company, Veddis Ventures, registered in Gibraltar. According to the Electoral Commission, Bhargava has donated around £200,000 to the Conservative Party via two of his companies, Stellite Finance and Aria Properties.

References

External links
 Guardian feature article
 Telegraph India feature article
 Time Magazine article
 The Hindu Business Line article
 Guardian Interview

1972 births
Living people
Businesspeople from London
British people of Indian descent
IIT Delhi alumni
Indian Institute of Management Calcutta alumni
People from Jaipur
British company founders